The women's 100 metres at the 2016 European Athletics Championships took place at the Olympic Stadium on 7 and 8 July.

Records

Schedule

Results

Round 1 

First 4 (Q) and next 3 fastest (q) qualify for the semifinals.

Heat 1: -0.5 m/s, Heat 2: -0.4 m/s, Heat 3: -1.0 m/s

Semifinals 

First 2 in each heat (Q) and the next 2 fastest (q) advance to the final.

Heat 1: -1.0 m/s, Heat 2: -0.4 m/s, Heat 3: 0.2 m/s

*Athletes who received a bye to the semifinals

Final 

Wind: -0.2 m/s

References

External links
 amsterdam2016.org, official championship site.

100 W
100 metres at the European Athletics Championships
2016 in women's athletics